A production or production rule in computer science is a rewrite rule specifying a symbol substitution that can be recursively performed to generate new symbol sequences. A finite set of productions  is the main component in the specification of a formal grammar (specifically a generative grammar).

So productions are members of the cartesian product

,

where  is the vocabulary,  is the Kleene star operator,  indicates concatenation,  denotes set union, and  denotes set minus or set difference.

The other types of formal grammar in the Chomsky hierarchy impose additional restrictions on what constitutes a production. Notably in a context-free grammar, the left-hand side of a production must be a single nonterminal symbol. So productions are of the form:

Grammar generation
To generate a string in the language, one begins with a string consisting of only a single start symbol, and then successively applies the rules (any number of times, in any order) to rewrite this string.  This stops when we obtain a string containing only terminals. The language consists of all the strings that can be generated in this manner.  Any particular sequence of legal choices taken during this rewriting process yields one particular string in the language. If there are multiple different ways of generating this single string, then the grammar is said to be ambiguous.

 1. 
 2. 

This process is repeated until we only have symbols from the alphabet (i.e.,  and ). We can write this series of choices more briefly, using symbols: . The language of the grammar is the set of all the strings that can be generated using this process: .

See also
 Formal grammar
 Finite automata
 Generative grammar
 L-system
 Rewrite rule
 Backus–Naur form (A compact form for writing the productions of a context-free grammar.)
 Phrase structure rule
 Post canonical system (Emil Post's production systems- a model of computation.)

References

Grammar
Natural language processing
Formal languages